Karl Bonhoeffer (March 31, 1868 – December 4, 1948) was a German neurologist, psychiatrist and physician.

Life 

Bonhoeffer was born in Neresheim in the Kingdom of Württemberg to Friedrich von Bonhoeffer (1828–1907), who worked as judge in Ulm, and Julie Tafel (1842–1936). His brother was chemist Gustav-Otto Bonhoeffer. From 1887 to 1892 Bonhoeffer studied medicine at the University of Tübingen, in Berlin and in Munich. From 1904 to 1912 Bonhoeffer worked as a professor at the University of Breslau. From 1912 to 1938 Bonhoeffer worked at the Charité in Berlin. In 1898, he married Paula von Hase (1876–1951). Two of his children were Klaus Bonhoeffer and Dietrich Bonhoeffer, both of whom were executed by the Nazis. One of his daughters was Christine von Dohnanyi and one more son was chemist Karl-Friedrich Bonhoeffer. Bonhoeffer died in Berlin at the age of 80 after the end of World War II.

Bonhoeffer was a part of the resistance movement against the Nazis after the Aktion T4 campaign was begun in 1939. He forged the documentation of disabled patients, suggested sources to other doctors to save patients. 

Although he contributed to the sterilization law, his efforts against Aktion T4 have led to him being remembered for the lives he saved and the influence he and his family had in fighting on the side of those who were deemed as "useless eaters".

Works by Bonhoeffer 

 "Ein Beitrag zur Kenntnis des großstädtischen Bettel- und Vagabundentums. Eine psychiatrische Untersuchung." Zeitschrift für die gesamte Strafrechtswissenschaft, vol. 21, 1–65. Berlin 1900.
 Die akuten Geisteskrankheiten der Gewohnheitstrinker. Jena 1901.
 Die symptomatischen Psychosen im Gefolge von akuten Infektionen und inneren Erkrankungen. Deuticke, Leipzig, Wien 1910.
 "Die Psychosen im Gefolge von akuten Infektionen, Allgemeinerkrankungen und inneren Erkrankerungen." In: Handbuch der Psychiatrie. Spezieller Teil. 3:1. Deuticke, Leipzig, Wien 1912, p. 1–120.
 "Die exogenen Reaktionstypen." Archiv für Psychiatrie und Nervenkrankheiten vol. 58, Berlin 1917, pp. 50–70.
 with P. Jossmann (ed.): Ergebnisse der Reiztherapie bei progressiver Paralyse. 1932.
 with K. Albrecht et al. (ed.): Die psychiatrischen Aufgaben bei der Ausführung des Gesetzes zur Verhütung erbkranken Nachwuchses. Mit einem Anhang Die Technik der Unfruchtbarmachung. Klinische Vorträge im erbbiologischen Kurs. Karger, Berlin 1934.
 (ed.): Die Erbkrankheiten. Klinische Vorträge im 2. erbbiologischen Kurs. 1936.
 "Die zentralen Bewegungsstörungen. Die akuten und chronischen choreatischen Erkrankungen und die Myoklonien." In: S. A. Kinnier-Wilson: Die zentralen Bewegungsstörungen. 1936.

External links

References 

German neuroscientists
German neurologists
German psychiatrists
Academic staff of the University of Breslau
1868 births
1948 deaths
German Protestants
Members of the German Academy of Sciences Leopoldina
University of Tübingen alumni
Physicians of the Charité
People from Neresheim
Physicians from Berlin
Ludwig Maximilian University of Munich alumni